Dawn K. Erb is an American physicist. She is an associate professor in the Department of Physics at the University of Wisconsin–Milwaukee.

Early life and education
Erb completed her PhD in Astrophysics from the California Institute of Technology in 2005 and accepted a Postdoctoral Fellowship at the Center for Astrophysics  Harvard & Smithsonian.

Career
In 2010, Erb joined the Department of Physics at the University of Wisconsin–Milwaukee as an associate professor and became a visiting assistant professor at the University of Wisconsin–Madison. While working in this role, she received an National Science Foundation Early Career Development Award worth $800,000 to conduct research on galaxy formation and evolution in the early universe. Erb subsequently published Feedback in low-mass galaxies in the early Universe which concluded that low-mass galaxies were vitally important to gain a better understanding of the universe's reionization. In 2018, her research was recognized by the National Academy of Sciences as she was selected as a Kavli Fellow by the National Academy of Science Frontiers of Science Program. Likewise, she led research at the W. M. Keck Observatory in Hawaii to examine a particular ultraviolet wavelength of light that illuminates a gaseous halo surrounding Q2343-BX418. During the COVID-19 pandemic, Erb was ranked in the top 2% of scientists around the world and named Research Mentor of the Year.

Selected publications

References

External links

Living people
American women physicists
21st-century American physicists
University of Washington alumni
California Institute of Technology alumni
University of Wisconsin–Milwaukee faculty
Year of birth missing (living people)
American women academics
21st-century American women scientists